Mumby is a village in the East Lindsey district of Lincolnshire, England. In 2001 the population was recorded as 352, increasing to 447 at the 2011 Census.

The village is mentioned in the Domesday Book of 1086 as consisting of 97 households.

The church is dedicated to St Thomas of Canterbury and is of Early English style. It is a Grade I Listed Building. The font is 14th century, and the western tower is 15th. It was repaired in 1844, with its chancel being rebuilt in 1874.  Further restorations were carried out between 1903 and 1908.

The dedication to St Thomas has been disputed; J. Charles Cox refers to a dedication to St Peter. It was originally called St Thomas of Canterbury, but it would appear it was briefly changed to St Peter, but has reverted to its original name.

In the churchyard is the lower part of a 14th-century Grade II listed and scheduled churchyard cross.

From 1888 until 1970 Mumby Road railway station, mentioned in Flanders and Swann's song Slow Train (1963), operated to the west of the village.

References

External links

Villages in Lincolnshire
Civil parishes in Lincolnshire
East Lindsey District